Helen Douglas (born 1952) is a Scottish book artist, publisher and educator.

Life and career
Douglas was born in Galashiels, grew up on a farm in the Scottish Borders, and studied at the Carlisle College of Art and Design. She received a BA in History of Art and Architecture from the University of East Anglia in 1973 and pursued post-graduate studies in textile design at the Scottish College of Textiles. In 1975, Douglas settled in Yarrow. She received a PhD from the Arts faculty at the University of Edinburgh in 1997.

Douglas has lectured at the Scottish College of Textiles, was a lecturer on book arts at the University of the Arts London, and has been part of a research group investigating the artist's book in digital format.

From 1975 to 1994, Douglas produced artist's books under the series name Weproductions in partnership with Telfer Stokes; since then, she has produced her books solo.

In 2006, Douglas was made a life member of the Museum of Modern Art in New York City.

Awards
Douglas has been awarded the:
 Publishing Award from the Scottish Arts Council for Chinese Whispers (1975)
 Publishing Award from the Arts Council of Great Britain for Clinkscale (1977)
 Hope Scott Trust Award for Water on the Border (1993)
 Atlanta Book Prize for Wild Wood (2001)
 Birgit Skiold Memorial Trust Award for excellence
 LAB 2004 for Illiers Combray
 LAB 2006 for Swan Songs with damselflies

References 

1952 births
Living people
Alumni of the University of East Anglia
Alumni of the University of Edinburgh
Women book artists
Book artists
Scottish women artists